London Confidential is an Indian Hindi-language spy thriller film which was premiered on ZEE5 on 18 September 2020. The film is directed by Kanwal Sethi and produced by Mohit Chhabra and Ajay Rai. It is created by S. Hussain Zaidi and stars Mouni Roy and Purab Kohli. The film is about R&AW agents in London investigating China's role in the pandemic with a ruthless mole in their midst. A Sequel titled Lahore Confidential was released on ZEE5 in 2021.

Plot
R&AW officials stationed in London have gathered strong evidence through their sources which indicate the involvement of Chinese Communist party in the spread of the virus and are very close to getting the final evidence. However, Chinese authorities get wind of this through a mole in the Indian embassy. In order to have a low-key presence the R&AW uses a grocery store as their outpost to execute and coordinate operations.

Cast

Release
London Confidential was premiered on ZEE5 on 18 September 2020.

Reception
Samrudhi Ghosh from Hindustan Times stated, “London Confidential is a crisp espionage thriller, at one hour and 14 minutes, but the trite and predictable climax does not live up to the interesting premise. India Today stated, “The screenplay is gripping and Kanwal Sethi’s direction does justice to it. The cinematography captures the London cityscape in an interesting hue. The editing is crisp and has ensured there are no dull moments in the film. All-in-all, ‘London Confidential’ is worth the full 1 hour and 17 minutes of your time”. Scroll.in mentioned, “The film is based on a concept by tireless conspiracy thriller churner S Hussain Zaidi. Written by Akshay Singh and Prateek Payodhi and directed by Kanwal Sethi, London Confidential doesn’t indulge in much Chinese-bashing. The focus is on sending Uma and Arjun on a wild-goose chase before they stumble upon the truth that is staring them in the face.

References

External links
 
 London Confidential on ZEE5

2020 films
Indian spy thriller films
2020s Hindi-language films
Films not released in theaters due to the COVID-19 pandemic
Films postponed due to the COVID-19 pandemic
ZEE5 original films
Films set in London
Films about the Research and Analysis Wing
2020 thriller films
2020s spy thriller films